Mariyappan Thangavelu (born 28 June 1995) is an Indian Paralympic high jumper. He represented India in the 2016 Summer Paralympics games  held in Rio de Janeiro in the  men's high jump T-42 category and the 2020 Summer Paralympic games held in Tokyo in the men's high jump T-63 category  , winning the gold medal and silver medal respectively in the finals. He is India's first Paralympian gold medalist since 2004.

On 25 January 2017, the Government of India conferred him with the Padma Shri award for his contribution towards sports and in the same year, he was also awarded the Arjuna Award. He was awarded with the Major Dhyan Chand Khel Ratna in 2020.

Early life
Mariyappan was born in Periavadagampatti village, Salem district, Tamil Nadu, one of six children (four brothers and a sister). His father reportedly abandoned the family early on and his mother, Saroja, raised her children as a single mother, carrying bricks as a labourer until becoming a vegetable seller, earning  a day. At the age of five, Mariyappan suffered permanent disability in his right leg when he was run over by a drunk bus driver while walking to school. The bus crushed his leg below the knee, causing it to become stunted. Despite this setback, he completed secondary schooling. He says that he didn't see himself as different from able-bodied kids.

Athletic career
Mariyappan enjoyed playing volleyball as a student; subsequently, his school physical education instructor encouraged him to try high jumping. In his first competitive event, aged 14, he placed second among a field of able-bodied competitors, after which he received strong encouragement from his classmates and others in Salem district. In 2013, his current coach Satyanarayana, supported by the Sports Academy of India for the Differently-Abled, first noticed his performance at the Indian national para-athletics championships, and formally took him on as a student in 2015, bringing him to Bengaluru for further coaching.

In November 2019, he cleared a distance of  min the Men's T-63 high jump event at the 2019 World Para Athletics Championships in Dubai to win the bronze medal, behind fellow Indian Sharad Kumar.

In August 2021, he won the silver medal in men's T-63 high jump event at the 2020 Summer Paralympics, which was the second medal in his Paralympic career.

Awards and recognition
Padma Shri (2017) - fourth highest Indian national honour
Arjuna Award (2017) - second highest Indian sporting honour, including a cash award of 
 from the Government of Tamil Nadu
 from the Ministry of Youth Affairs and Sports
 from the Government of Madhya Pradesh
 from the Ministry of Social Justice and Empowerment
 from fund established by Sachin Tendulkar, various corporations.
 from Yash Raj Films
 from the Delhi Golf Club
 from NRI businessman Mukkattu Sebastian
Major Dhyan Chand Khel Ratna (2020) - highest sporting honour of India.

Personal life
Mariyappan has an elder sister Sudha and two younger brothers Kumar and Gopi. In 2015, he completed a bachelor's degree in business administration.

Following his Paralympic triumph, Mariyappan used some of his prize money to buy his mother a paddy field, so his family could enjoy a more stable source of income, and also used his winnings to build a better house for his family, depositing the remaining sums in an account. In August 2017, Mariyappan said that while it was "a good feeling" to be recognised and to have his neighbours treat him with great respect, he felt "a slight sadness" that even his friends now treated him with increased formality, which irritated him. In a separate interview that month, he said that though he remained committed to an athletic career, he had been living off his prize money, and was in desperate need of a steady job to support his family. He said he had requested help from the Tamil Nadu government, but had not received a reply.

In October 2018, he was named as the flag bearer for the 2018 Asian Para Games held in Jakarta that month. On 7 December, he was offered a Group A post as a coach with the Sports Authority of India.

A petition to implead T Mariappan, recipient of gold medal in Para-Olympics competitions held recently, in a youth’s death case, has been filed in the Madras High Court. According to the petitioner, her son Sathish Kumar (19) faced the wrath of Mariappan for dashing his two-wheeler against the latter’s new Mahindra car on 3 June last. He was beaten up by Mariappan and his friends Sabari and Yuvaraj. When they snatched his mobile phone, Sathish Kumar ran behind them to get it back. Since then he was missing. However, he was found dead near the railway track the next day. She lodged a complaint with local police on the death of her son and also sought protection. As there was no effective action, she filed the present.

References

1995 births
Living people
Athletes (track and field) at the 2016 Summer Paralympics
Athletes from Tamil Nadu
People from Salem district
Indian male high jumpers
Paralympic athletes of India
Medalists at the 2016 Summer Paralympics
Medalists at the 2020 Summer Paralympics
Recipients of the Padma Shri in sports
Paralympic gold medalists for India
Paralympic silver medalists for India
Tamil sportspeople
Paralympic medalists in athletics (track and field)
Recipients of the Khel Ratna Award
Recipients of the Arjuna Award
Athletes (track and field) at the 2020 Summer Paralympics